Peter Jeffrey (1929-1999) was an English actor

Peter Jeffrey can also refer to:
 Peter Jeffrey (RAAF officer) (1913–1997), Australian senior office and fighter ace in the Royal Australian Air Force
 Peter Jeffrey (badminton) (born 1975), retired English badminton player

See also 
 Peter Jeffery, American musicologist